Brynford is a village and community in Flintshire, Wales. It is located to the south west of the town of Holywell and near the A55 road (North Wales Expressway). Brynford had a population of 1,059 at the 2011 census.

St Michael's Church (Church in Wales) dates from 1851 and is a Grade II listed building. The Cynfaen Memorial Methodist Chapel, serving Brynford, is in the nearby village of Calcoed.

Historically, the area was extensively mined for lead and has been left with the scars of that past all over its common land.

The explorer and journalist Henry Morton Stanley was a student teacher in the old village school.

The community includes the villages of Calcoed and Dolphin.

Governance
An electoral ward of the same name exists. This ward stretches south east to Halkyn community and had a total population at the 2011 census of 2,153.

References

External links
Brynford community site
Photos of Brynford and surrounding area on geograph.org.uk

Villages in Flintshire
Communities in Flintshire